Jeressar High School is a school in Soroti, Uganda. 

Educational institutions with year of establishment missing
Schools in Uganda
Soroti